The Storm Lake Community School District is a rural public school district based in Storm Lake, Iowa.  The district is mainly in Buena Vista County, with a small area in Sac County, and serves the town of Storm Lake and surrounding areas.

The school's mascot is the Tornadoes. Their colors are green and white.

Schools
The district operates five schools, all in Storm Lake:
East Early Childhood Center
Storm Lake Early Elementary School
Storm Lake Elementary School
Storm Lake Middle School
Storm Lake High School

Athletics
The Tornadoes compete in the Lakes Conference in the following sports:

Baseball (boys)
Basketball (boys and girls)
 Boys' 2-time State Champions (1968, 1980)
Cross Country (boys and girls)
Football
Golf (boys and girls)
 1961 Boys' State Champions
Soccer (boys and girls)
Softball (girls)
Swimming (boys and girls)
Tennis (boys and girls)
Track and Field (boys and girls)
 Boys' 3-time Class 3A State Champions (1987, 1988, 2002)
Volleyball (girls)
Wrestling

Enrollment

See also
List of school districts in Iowa
List of high schools in Iowa

References

External links
 Storm Lake Community School District

Education in Buena Vista County, Iowa
Education in Sac County, Iowa
School districts in Iowa